was an online community-based social gaming networking service developed by Square Enix for the NTT DoCoMo in partnership with Disney Mobile Japan. It was launched on December 15, 2008 in Japan in conjunction with the video game Kingdom Hearts coded for mobile phones.

Mobile is not part of the main Kingdom Hearts storyline. It consists of various mini-games as well as downloadable Kingdom Hearts related content such as ringtones and wallpapers. The service ended on April 30, 2013.

Gameplay

Kingdom Hearts Mobile is a 2D online world known as the Avatar Kingdom where players can explore and roam around freely as their avatars.

Avatars
Players roam the Avatar Kingdom by controlling their own customized avatar which can be personalized through various means and items. These include outfits, weapons, and items which are purchasable in the game's online store using munny, which is the game's virtual currency. Avatars are used to play mini-games, meet up and chat with friends as well as do activities together within the Avatar Kingdom. Outfits as well as backgrounds can be earned by players whenever they complete an episode of Kingdom Hearts coded.

Areas
There are many areas located within the Avatar Kingdom, including areas for downloading items, socializing, and playing mini-games. The areas are as follows: Event Hall which serves as the main area for people to participate together with friends in activities; Point Bank where players can keep track of their points as well as munny that they have earned; Mini-game Item Shop where avatars can by outfits based on Kingdom Hearts characters which they have earned by winning certain mini-games; Point Item Shop where players can buy different clothes for their avatars as well as customizing the avatar's facial features and hairstyles; Mini-game Shop where players can buy new mini-games; Information Center which provides help and support for players; V Net Room which is the player's own personal area where he can customize profiles, view friends and email other avatars; Point Melody Shop where players can buy ringtones based on songs from Kingdom Hearts games; Point Art Gallery where players can buy various backgrounds, wallpapers, graphics or icon based on the Kingdom Hearts series; Awards Area which is the player's own trophy room displaying the player's high scores at mini-games; Changing Area which is where the player can customize his avatars clothing and items.

Mini-games

There are various types of mini-games scattered all around the Avatar Kingdom which players can engage their avatars in these include: Magical Canvas, Pair Card Battle, Card Struggle, Balloon Glider, Gummi Ship Studio, Card Struggle II, and Rhythm Parade. Each game is unique and contains its own unique gameplay such as Card Struggle being based on Spider Solitaire, Gummi Ship Studio on traditional color-based puzzle games, Rhythm Parade on popular music games which involves pressing a string of buttons based on what appears on-screen, and Balloon Glider on one of the mini-games in the 100 Acre Wood world of Kingdom Hearts Re:Chain of Memories.

Development
Kingdom Hearts Mobile was announced at the same time as Kingdom Hearts coded and launched a month later on December 15, 2008 in Japan. Various updates have been added to it such as new costumes to coincide with the release of new episodes of Kingdom Hearts coded as well as new areas to explore, and new mini-games to play such as Rhythm Parade which was added in September 2009.

Kingdom Hearts Mobile celebrated its first anniversary on December 15, 2009 with special events going on within the Avatar Kingdom as well as new costumes of the three main protagonists, Terra, Aqua and Ventus of the game Kingdom Hearts Birth by Sleep, which was released less than a month later. On December 27, 2009 Square Enix released special Kingdom Hearts themed wallpapers for mobile phones to celebrate the upcoming Christmas holiday as well as additional wallpapers to celebrate its first anniversary.

Reception
The art style has been called "cute" by Wired Magazine and "disgustingly cute" by Siliconera. The game's art style was used again in Theatrhythm Final Fantasy, Kingdom Hearts Re:coded, and Final Fantasy Airborne Brigade.

References

External links
 Kingdom Hearts Mobile site 
 Official Kingdom Hearts blog 

2008 video games
Kingdom Hearts
Mobile games
Online video game services
Video games developed in Japan